City of federal subject significance is an administrative division of a federal subject of Russia which is equal in status to a district but is organized around a large city; occasionally with surrounding rural territories.

Description
According to the 1993 Constitution of Russia, the administrative-territorial structure of the federal subjects is not identified as the responsibility of the federal government or as the joint responsibility of the federal government and the federal subjects. This state of the matters is traditionally interpreted by the governments of the federal subjects as a sign that the matters of the administrative-territorial divisions are the sole responsibility of the federal subjects themselves. As a result, the modern administrative-territorial structures of the federal subjects vary significantly from one federal subject to another; that includes the manner in which the cities of federal subject significance are organized and the choice of a term to refer to such entities. In the federal subjects which have closed administrative-territorial formations, those are often given a similar status. Occasionally, this status is also given to the areas organized around the inhabited localities which are not cities, but smaller urban-type settlements.

List of designations
As of 2013, the following types of such entities are recognized:

References

Administrative divisions of Russia